John Colletts plass (John Collett's Square) is a light rail tram stop on the Oslo Tramway.

Located in Ullevål Hageby in Nordre Aker borough, it was opened in 1925 as the terminus of the Ullevål Hageby Line. The name was given in 1938. In 1999 the line was extended to Rikshospitalet.

The most prominent building at the square is the former Ullevål Cinema. It was closed as a cinema in 1964, but is now used for lectures at the University of Oslo. The university campus is located a few hundred metres west of John Colletts plass.

References

Oslo Tramway stations in Oslo
Railway stations opened in 1925